The Secret of Woronzeff (French: Le secret des Woronzeff) is a 1935 drama film directed by André Beucler and Arthur Robison and starring Jean Murat, Brigitte Helm and Madeleine Ozeray.

It was made by the German studio UFA as a French-language version of the company's 1934 film Count Woronzeff.

Cast
 Jean Murat as Le prince Woronzeff  
 Brigitte Helm as Diane  
 Madeleine Ozeray as Nadia  
 Vladimir Sokoloff as Petroff  
 Marguerite Templey as La tante Adèle  
 Gaston Dubosc as L'oncle Ivan  
 Pierre Mingand as Le frère von Naydeck  
 Guy Sloux 
 Charles Redgie 
 Marc-Hély 
 Henry Bonvallet 
 Raymond Aimos 
Jane Pierson 
 Marguerite de Morlaye

References

Bibliography 
 Bock, Hans-Michael & Bergfelder, Tim. The Concise CineGraph. Encyclopedia of German Cinema. Berghahn Books, 2009.

External links 
 

1935 films
1935 drama films
German drama films
Films of Nazi Germany
1930s French-language films
Films directed by Arthur Robison
Films directed by André Beucler
UFA GmbH films
German multilingual films
German black-and-white films
1935 multilingual films
1930s German films